As of 106th race, May 29th 2022.

Race records

Victories

Quantity

{| class="wikitable"
|style="background:#F2F2F2;" align="center" colspan="6"|Most driver-owner victoriesDriver-owners with at least two victories|-
!Wins
!Driver-Owner
|style="background:#F2F2F2;" align="center" colspan="3"|Years
!Notes
|-
|style="background:#F2F2F2;" align="center"|3
| A. J. Foyt
|align="center"|1964
|align="center"|1967
|align="center"|1977
|Driver, 1961 winning entry; owner, 1999 winning entry
|-
|style="background:#F2F2F2;" align="center"|2
| Louis Meyer
|align="center"|1933
|align="center"|1936
|bgcolor="#F2F2F2" align="center"| 
|Driver, 1928 winning entry
|-
|style="background:#F2F2F2;" align="center" colspan="6"|See Driver/Owners for full listing|}

QualityDefending champion finishing second: 8
 Louis Meyer, 1929
 Wilbur Shaw, 1938
 Bill Holland, 1950
 Rodger Ward, 1960
 Jim Clark, 1966
 Al Unser, 1972
 Johnny Rutherford, 1975
 Hélio Castroneves, 2003Defending second place-finisher winning: 14
 Dario Resta, 1916
 Fred Frame, 1932
 Wilbur Shaw, 1939
 Bill Holland*, 1949
 Johnnie Parsons, 1950
 Sam Hanks, 1957
 Jim Rathmann, 1960
 Bobby Unser, 1975
 Johnny Rutherford, 1976
 A. J. Foyt, 1977
 Emerson Fittipaldi, 1989
 Jacques Villeneuve, 1995
 Scott Dixon, 2008
 Dan Wheldon*, 2011
 * Won after two consecutive second-place finishes.Co-winners (one driver starting a race but another driver finishing in the same winning entry): 2
 Lora L. Corum /  Joe Boyer, 1924
 Floyd Davis /  Mauri Rose, 1941
Victories by drivers who never led a race lap in career: 2 (Corum and Davis, in those same years)
Won Triple Crown of Motorsport (Indianapolis 500, Monaco Grand Prix, and 24 Hours of Le Mans):
 Graham Hill (1966 / 1963, 1964, 1965, 1968, 1969 / 1972)
Won Indianapolis 500, World Championship and 24 Hours of Le Mans):
 Graham Hill (1966 / 1962, 1968 / 1972)
Won Indianapolis 500 and World Championship: 5
 Jim Clark (1965 / 1963, 1965)
 Graham Hill (1966 / 1962, 1968)
 Mario Andretti (1969 / 1978)
 Emerson Fittipaldi (1989, 1993 / 1972, 1974)
 Jacques Villeneuve (1995 / 1997)
Won Indianapolis 500 and 24 Hours of Le Mans: 2
 A. J. Foyt (1961, 1964, 1967, 1977 / 1967)
 Graham Hill (1966 / 1972)
Won Indianapolis 500 and 24 Hours of Daytona:
 A. J. Foyt (1961, 1964, 1967, 1977 / 1983, 1985)
 Al Unser (1970, 1971, 1978, 1987 / 1985)
 Mark Donohue (1972 / 1969)
 Mario Andretti (1969 / 1972* shortened due to gas shortage)
 Bobby Rahal (1986 / 1981)
 Arie Luyendyk (1990, 1997 / 1998)
 Al Unser Jr. (1992, 1994 / 1986, 1987)
 Juan Pablo Montoya (2000, 2015 / 2007, 2008, 2013)
 Dan Wheldon (2005, 2011 / 2006)
 Scott Dixon (2008 / 2006, 2015, 2020)
 Buddy Rice (2004 / 2009)
 Dario Franchitti (2007, 2010, 2012 / 2008)
 Tony Kanaan (2013 / 2015)
 Helio Castroneves (2001, 2002, 2009, 2021 / 2021, 2022)
 Alexander Rossi (2016 / 2021)
 Simon Pagenaud (2019 / 2022)
Won Indianapolis 500 and Monaco Grand Prix:
 Graham Hill (1966 / 1963, 1964, 1965, 1968, 1969)
 Juan Pablo Montoya (2000, 2015 / 2003)
Won Indianapolis 500 and 12 Hours of Sebring:
 Mario Andretti (1969 / 1967, 1970, 1972)
 A. J. Foyt (1961, 1964, 1967, 1977 / 1985)
 Bobby Rahal (1986 / 1987)
 Arie Luyendyk (1990, 1997 / 1989)
 Ryan Hunter-Reay (2014 / 2020)
Won Indianapolis 500 and Daytona 500:
 Mario Andretti (1969 / 1967)
 A. J. Foyt (1961, 1964, 1967, 1977 / 1972)
Won Indianapolis 500 and Petit Le Mans:
 Ryan Hunter-Reay (2014 / 2018)
 Scott Dixon (2008 / 2020)
 Hélio Castroneves (2001, 2002, 2009, 2021 / 2022)
Won Indianapolis 500, World Championship, and Daytona 500:
 Mario Andretti (1969 / 1978 / 1967)
Won Indianapolis 500, 24 Hours of Le Mans, and Daytona 500:
 A. J. Foyt (1961, 1964, 1967, 1977 / 1967 / 1972)

Narrowest Margin of Victory:
 Al Unser Jr. over  Scott Goodyear, 1992
Official margin: 0.043 second
Unofficial margin: 0.033 second 

Widest Margin of Victory:
Preceding 1966 (first year of top five finishing entry being flagged off before completing 500 miles):
13 minutes, 8 seconds,  Jules Goux over  Spencer Wishart, 1913
Succeeding 1966 (year inclusive):
2 laps +0:00.021,  Rick Mears over  Roberto Guerrero, 1984
2 laps,  A. J. Foyt over  Al Unser, 1967 (race red flagged, second place reverted to last completed lap)
2 laps,  Emerson Fittipaldi over  Al Unser Jr., 1989 (second place car did not finish 199th lap, third place 6 laps behind leader)

Speed and qualification records

Lap speed records

Pole positions

Average race speeds

Lap leader records

Led opening lap and final lap: 21 entries among 19 drivers
Jimmy Murphy, 1922
Joe Boyer, 1924 (only occasion of occurrence in separate entries)
Peter DePaolo, 1925
Lee Wallard, 1951
Bill Vukovich, 1953
Jimmy Bryan, 1958
Jim Clark, 1965
Mario Andretti, 1969
Al Unser, 1970
Johnny Rutherford, 1976
Johnny Rutherford, 1980
Bobby Unser, 1981
Rick Mears, 1984
Emerson Fittipaldi, 1989
Rick Mears, 1991
Al Unser Jr., 1994
Buddy Rice, 2004
Scott Dixon, 2008
Hélio Castroneves, 2009
Dario Franchitti, 2010
Simon Pagenaud, 2019

Age records

Oldest Starter:
  A. J. Foyt Jr., 57 years, 128 days old, 1992

Youngest Starter:
  A. J. Foyt IV, 19 years, 0 days old, 2003

Miscellaneous competitive records

Most former winners starting race:
 10 – 1992

Fewest former winners starting race:
 0 – 1912

Most rookies starting race:
 19 – 1919, 1930 (excluding first race's 40 starters)

Fewest rookies starting race:
 1 – 1939, 1979

Most cars running at finish:
 30 – 2021

Fewest cars running at finish:
 7 – 1966

Most occasions running at finish:
 2: 18, A. J. Foyt and Al Unser

Greatest improvement from starting position to finishing position (all-time):
 32 positions, 38th to 6th, Zeke Meyer, 1932

Greatest improvement from starting position to finishing position (33-car field):
 31 positions, 33rd to 2nd Tom Sneva, 1980
 31 positions, 33rd to 2nd Scott Goodyear, 1992

Most consecutive laps completed without falling out of competition:
 2,310 laps, Hélio Castroneves, 2007-2018 (from the start of the 2007 race through lap 145 of 2018 race)

Most cars and teams entered
 117, 1984

Race conditions

Distance records

Most years completing the full 500 miles

16 Hélio Castroneves (2001, 2002, 2003, 2005, 2008, 2009, 2010, 2012, 2013, 2014, 2015, 2016, 2017, 2020, 2021, 2022)

Most consecutive years completing the full 500 miles
6 Wilbur Shaw (1935-1940)
6 Rodger Ward (1959-1964)
6 Scott Dixon (2008-2013)
6 Hélio Castroneves (2012-2017)

Most consecutive laps completed

1,367 Scott Dixon (from the start of the 2008 race through lap 167 of 2014 race)

Interval average speed records

Related lists

Drivers who crashed while leading during final one hundred miles of race (Lap 160+)
1931: Billy Arnold - Arnold charged from 18th starting position to lead the race by lap 7. Arnold, who had dominated the 1930 race (led 198 laps), proceeded to lead the next 155 laps, and built up a five-lap lead over second place. His rear axle broke on lap 162. He spun in turn four, was hit by another car, and went over the outside wall. One of his errant wheels bounced across Georgetown Road, and struck and killed a 12-year-old boy, Wilbur C. Brink. Arnold suffered a broken pelvis, and his riding mechanic, Spider Matlock, broke his shoulder.
1952: Bill Vukovich - Vukovich led 150 laps, and was leading on lap 192 when a steering linkage failed. Vukovich nursed his car to a stop by driving up against the outside wall at the end of the back straightaway at the beginning of turn three, preventing other drivers from getting involved in the incident.
1989: Al Unser Jr. - On the 199th lap, Al Unser Jr. was leading Fittipaldi down the backstretch. The two cars weaving through lap traffic, and Fittipaldi dove underneath Unser exiting turn two. Racing side-with Unser drawing back ahead by a nose entering turn three, the two cars touched wheels, and Unser spun out, crashing into the outside wall. Fittipaldi coasted around the final lap under caution to score his first race victory.
1994: Emerson Fittipaldi - while leading the race on lap 184, Fittipaldi was attempting to lap his teammate Al Unser Jr., who was running second. Coming out of turn four, Fittipaldi's left wheels touched the rumble strips on the inside, causing the left side tires to lose adhesion, and the rear of the car to swing wide at the turn exit, resulting in the rear tagging the outside wall and knocking Fittipaldi out of the race. Unser Jr. went on to win.
2002: Tomas Scheckter - After leading 85 laps during the race, the rookie was leading on lap 173. Coming out of turn 4, he slid high and smacked the outside wall down the frontstretch.
2011: J. R. Hildebrand - During the final ten laps, a sequence of green flag pit stops shuffled the field. Rookie J. R. Hildebrand was attempting to stretch his fuel to the finish, and took over the lead with just over two laps to go. On the final lap, he was leading going into the final turn, when he came up on the lapped car of Charlie Kimball, who was slowing to the inside. Hildebrand went high, got into the "marbles," and smacked the outside wall. Without steering, and only on three wheels, his car slid down the frontstretch towards the finish line and the checkered flag. However, Hildebrand was passed by Dan Wheldon on the final 1,000 feet and Hildebrand finished second.

References

Records
Auto racing records